NIMS may refer to:

 National Incident Management System, used in the United States to coordinate emergency preparations and responses
 National Institute for Materials Science, a Japanese research institution
 National Institute for Mathematical Sciences, a research institution in South Korea
 Near-Infrared Mapping Spectrometer, a device on the spacecraft Galileo
 New Indian Model School, a group of schools in United Arab Emirates
 Nihon Institute of Medical Science, a medical university in Saitama, Japan
 NIMS University in Jaipur, India
 Nizam's Institute of Medical Sciences, a medical university in Telangana, India
 NUST Business School (formerly NUST Institute of Management Sciences), Pakistan 

Nims may refer to:

 Nims (river), in Rhineland-Palatinate, Germany, left tributary of the Prüm
 Arthur Nims (born 1923), United States Tax Court judge
 John Frederick Nims (1913–1999), American poet
 Kenny Nims (born 1987), American lacrosse player
 Nirmal Purja, Nepalese mountaineer known as Nims

See also
NIM (disambiguation)
NIMH (disambiguation)